The knife game, pinfinger, nerve, bishop, knife fingies,
five finger fillet (FFF), Chicken or the stab between the fingers game , is a game wherein, placing the palm of one's hand down on a table with fingers apart, using a knife (such as a pocket or pen knife), or other sharp object, one attempts to stab back and forth between one's fingers, trying not to hit one's fingers. The game is intentionally dangerous, exposing players to the risk of injury and scarring, and, before antibiotics, an incision or penetration risked sepsis and death. A foldable blade carries the additional danger that, "as the faster you go, the more likely the blade will fold back in on itself trapping the finger of your stabbing hand." It may be played much more safely by using another object, such as the eraser side of a pencil or a marker with its cap on. In European culture it is traditionally considered a boys' game. However, its focus on motor coordination and dexterity is comparable to clapping games.

Order of "stabbing"

The order in which the spaces between the fingers are stabbed varies. In the following examples, the space numbered 1 is to the outside of the thumb, with numbering then proceeding to the space between the thumb and index finger and so forth.

The most popular version is to simply stab all the spaces in order, starting from behind the thumb to after the little finger, and back again ("In its simplest form, one would simply move as fast as one dared backwards and forwards."):
  1-2-3-4-5-6-5-4-3-2 (repeat).

A more complex order is also common ("Those with stronger nerves could stab according to a sequence"):
  1-2-1-3-1-4-1-5-1-6-1-5-1-4-1-3-1-2 (repeats until the end of the song)

or an even more complex order:
  1-2-1-3-1-4-1-5-1-6-2-6-3-6-4-6-5-6-4-6-3-6-2-6 (etc.)

In Australia, the following order is used.
  1-2-1-3-1-4-1-5-1-6 (repeat)

or an EVEN more complex order:
  1-2-1-3-1-4-1-5-1-6-2-1-2-3-2-4-2-5-2-6-3-1-3-2-3-4-3-5-3-6-4-1-4-2-4-3-4-5-4-6-5-1-5-2-5-3-5-4-5-6-6-1-6-2-6-3-6-4-6-5

Popular culture

Roman Polanski's first feature Knife in the Water (1962) may be the first film to show the game; a young hitchhiker plays the game on the deck of a sailboat.

The movie Aliens (1986) features a scene with a android member of the crew, Bishop, who plays the "knife game" with another member of the crew.

In Season 1, episode 6 of the HBO series Boardwalk Empire (2010) features a young WWI veteran, Jimmy Darmody, playing "Five Finger Fillet," and requesting the young Al Capone to join in.

In the Sierra On-Line game Manhunter: New York (1988), one sequence requires winning the knife game in a Brooklyn bar in order to continue the winning plot.

It also appears as a minigame called "Wee Hand" in the 2007 video game Jackass: The Game, though here set to a one minute timer.

Knife.Hand.Chop.Bot (2007), by the Svoltcore group, is an "interactive installation that plays with the recipient's concern about [his or her] own physical integrity."

In the King of the Hill episode "Death and Texas," an inmate tells Peggy that the "stab a knife around your fingers" game is fun, but he doesn't believe it has a name. Peggy suggests "Stabscotch."

The knife game also appears as an unnamed gambling minigame in a popular video game released by Bethesda Softworks and id Software in 2011 called Rage (video game).

Knife game song
On August 31, 2011, a YouTube video entitled "The Knife Game Song" created by songwriter Rusty Cage was released. Several internet users uploaded videos of themselves singing the song while playing the knife game. A new version of the song with additional lyrics was later released on March 29, 2013.

The viral popularity of the song inspired an episode of the game show Unschlagbar, in which contestants were required to stab a knife between their fingers as many times as possible in thirty seconds without harming themselves. Rusty Cage, who traveled from America in order to compete, was crowned the winner and awarded €50.000 in prize money.

In 2017, Rusty Cage released a video detailing his side of the story on the knife game. He uploaded his final knife game song on April 29, 2017. In January 2019, Rusty made many of his Knife Game videos private to prevent his Youtube channel from receiving strikes and potentially being terminated. He subsequently transferred many of his videos to a BitChute account for preservation. Re-uploads of the songs continue to proliferate on YouTube from other users.

See also
Bloody knuckles
Capoeira
Moving-knife game
Scarification
Self-injury
Mumblety-peg

References

Knives
Hand games
Boys' toys and games
Risk